Edward Charles Goodwin (born September 4, 1952) is an American politician from the state of North Carolina. A Republican, he is a member of the North Carolina House of Representatives, representing the 1st district (including all of Bertie, Camden, Chowan, Perquimans, Tyrrell, and Washington counties).

Career 
Goodwin served in the United States Air Force from 1972 to 1976. He graduated from graduated from East Carolina University with a bachelor's degree in 1981. He then served in the Naval Criminal Investigative Service from 1983 to 2004. Goodwin was elected county commissioner of Chowan County, North Carolina, in 2008. He ran against Elaine Marshall for Secretary of State of North Carolina in 2012, and lost. He served as an aide to Governor Pat McCrory, who appointed him as director of the North Carolina Department of Transportation Ferry Division in 2014. He left the position in 2017. He ran for the North Carolina House in 2018, and won.

Electoral history

2020

2018

2012

Committee assignments

2021-2022 session

Appropriations (Vice chair)
Appropriations - Agriculture and Natural and Economic Resources (Chair)
Homeland Security, Military, and Veterans Affairs (Chair)
Environment
Transportation 
Agriculture 
State Personnel 
Marine Resources and Aqua Culture

2019-2020 session
Appropriations 
Appropriations - Agriculture and Natural and Economic Resources 
Appropriations - Capital
Insurance 
Environment 
Transportation

References

External links

1952 births
Living people
People from Edenton, North Carolina
Military personnel from North Carolina
East Carolina University alumni
United States Air Force airmen
Naval Criminal Investigative Service people
County commissioners in North Carolina
Republican Party members of the North Carolina House of Representatives
21st-century American politicians